The Yuz Museum Shanghai (Chinese: 余德耀美术馆) is a non-profit organization under the umbrella of the Yuz Foundation. It is located in the West Bund in Xuhui District, Shanghai. Yuz is reconstructed from the hangar of the original Longhua Airport and designed by Japanese architect Sou Fujimoto.

Among the buildings with a total area of more than 9000 square meters, the main gallery alone accounts for more than 3000 square meters. Its enormous and unique structure perfectly complement the installations of YUZ collection. Since its establishment and opening on May 17, 2014, Yuz museum has become a new landmark of Shanghai.

Visiting 
Yuz Museum will be open to the public from 10am to 6pm from Tuesday to Sunday (closed on Monday).

No parking space available.

About the founder 
The Yuz Museum was founded by Mr. Budi Tek, a Chinese-Indonesian entrepreneur, art philanthropist and collector. Mr. Budi Tek starts art collection about ten years ago. He found the unique charm of art and became a serious collector. Mr. Budi Tek's collection began with Chinese contemporary oil paintings, especially works created from the early 1980s to the late 1990s. Now, he has established a considerable collection system of Chinese contemporary art.

About the curator 
Wu Hung is currently chair of the Academic Committee of Yuz Museum. He is also the founder and director of the Center for the Art of East Asia at the University of Chicago, the Consulting Curator at the Smart Museum, and an elected member of the American Academy of Arts and Sciences.

About Yuz foundation 
Principle: Collect the contemporary, promote the art museum movement, and actively participate in public welfare undertakings.

Motto: Art is a lasting endurance and a gift; it is faith, hope and love of artistic life.

Purpose: Yuz foundation is a non-profit organization. Since its establishment in 2007, it has been committed to enhancing the growth of contemporary artists, promoting the development of contemporary art, and actively participating in diversified art activities and projects. Mr. Budi Tek hopes to build a platform for the communication and development of Asian and Western contemporary art and artists.

In 2018, Yuz museum and LACMA announced a cooperation that they will jointly to establish a foundation to preserve Budi Tek's denoted Chinese Contemporary Art Collection. The new foundation in cooperation with LACMA will manage Budi Tek's collection, and it will ensure that most of Budi Tek's collection will remain intact and permanently available for exhibitions and academic research.

Past exhibitions 
Ni Youyu: ∞ (2019.8.17 – 2019.10.20 )

Nine Journeys Through Time (2019.7.3 – 2019.10.7 )

Duet: A Tan Ping Retrospective 双重奏：谭平回顾展 (2019.6.15 – 2019.9.22 )

Su-Mei Tse: Nested 谢素梅：安棲  (2018.12.18 – 2019.3.24)

The Real Deal is Talking with Dad 陈可：和爸爸聊天才是正经事  (2018.12.22 – 2019.3.24)

MAURIZIO CATTELAN – THE ARTIST IS PRESENT(2018.10.11 – 2018.12.16)

Tschabalala Self: Bodega Run (2018.09.22 – 2018.12.09)

CHARLIE CHAPLIN. A VISION (2018.06.08 – 2018.10.07)Melike Kara: A Taste of Parsley (2018.07.07 – 2018.09.09)

Random International: Everything & Nothing (2018.04.20 – 2018.09.02)

Donna Huanca: Cell Echo (2018.03.24 – 2018.06.03)

Ye Yongqing: 1982-1992 无中生有的年代 (2018.04.12 – 2018.05.20)

Joshua Nathanson: High Flow (2018.02.03 – 2018.04.04)

Alicja Kwade: ReReason (2017.12.17 – 2018.04.01)

Shanghai Galaxy II (2017.11.10 – 2018.02.11)

The Dance of Icarus (2017.11.12 – 2018.01.21)

QIN YIFENG’S WORKS 秦一峰展  (2017.09.02 – 2017.12.03)

Math Bass: Serpentine Door (2017.06.24 – 2017.10.08)

Will / We Must 周铁海：必须  (2017.07.11 – 2017.08.27)

KAWS: WHERE THE END STARTS (2017.03.28 – 2017.08.13)

Zhou Li: Shadow of the Wind 周力：白影  (2017.02.25 – 2017.06.04)Jennifer West: “Is Film Over?” (2017.03.18 – 2017.05.28)

Mira Dancy: “FUTURE WOMAN // remake me” (2016.11.8 – 2017.03.12)

Sun Xun: Prediction Laboratory 孙逊：谶语实验室  (2016.11.19 – 2017.03.05)

ANDY WARHOL, SHADOWS (2016.09.04 – 2017.01.15)

OVERPOP (2016.09.04 – 2017.01.15)

Alberto Giacometti’s Retrospective (2016.3.22 — 2016.7.31)

Koo Jeong A: Enigma of Beginnings (2016.3.26 — 2016.5.29)

Liu Shiyuan: As Simple As Clay 刘诗园：像泥巴一样简单  (2015.11.14 — 2016.1.31)

Rain Room by Random International (2015.9.1 — 2016.1.3)

Twin Tracks: Yang Fudong Solo Exhibition “南辕北辙 ”——杨福东作品展  (2015.9.1 — 2015.11.23)

Secundino Hernández/Entre Primavera y Verano (2015.9.1 — 2015.10.11)

Huang Yuxing: Liquidus 黄宇兴：熔流  (2015.9.1 — 2015.10.11)

Myth/History II: Shanghai Galaxy

Myth / History (2014.5.18 — 2014.11.18)

References

Museums in Shanghai
Art museums established in 2014
Art museums and galleries in China
2014 establishments in China